Nora May Mohler (1898 – November 29, 1984) was an American physicist, elected a Fellow of the American Physical Society in 1941.

Biography
Born in Carlisle, Pennsylvania, she was the daughter of John Frederick Mohler, a mathematician and physicist at Dickinson College and his wife Sarah Loomis Mohler. Mohler attended Conway Hall Preparatory School in Carlisle, graduating as class valedictorian; she was the last girl to attend the school, which subsequently became an all-boys institution. She went on to earn a bachelor's degree in 1917 from Dickinson College, and then undertook graduate studies at Bryn Mawr, where she was inducted into Phi Beta Kappa.

After studying at Bryn Mawr and Radcliffe College, Mohler held teaching positions. She joined the faculty of Smith College as an instructor in 1927, then began research work under the supervision of Gladys Anslow, earning a PhD in 1934. This was the first PhD in physics that Smith had ever awarded. She attained the status of associate professor of physics by 1937; that year and the following, she conducted research at the Cavendish Laboratory.  From 1943 to 1946, she took a leave from Smith to do wartime research at  the MIT Radiation Laboratory and for the National Defense Research Committee. She became chair of Smith's physics department in 1946. In 1950, Dickinson awarded her an Honorary Doctorate of Science.

In 1951, Mohler was elected Vice-Chair of the American Physical Society's New England section. From 1953 through 1957, she served on the advisory board of the American Journal of Physics.

Selected publications
 
  (Described in Nature as "a very interesting study of Swift's Voyage to Laputa, in which they show how carefully Swift read the contemporary scientific literature and how skilfully he was able to make use of it in his own writings".)

References

External links
 Dickinsonian, June 10, 1915
 Annual Report of the Secretary of the Optical Society of America for the Calendar Year 1936
 John Mohler's obituary
 The Smith Alumnae Quarterly
 Annual Register of the Alumnae Association of Smith College
 Newton Demands the Muse: Newton's Opticks and the Eighteenth Century Poets
 American Men of Science

1898 births
1984 deaths
Dickinson College alumni
Bryn Mawr College alumni
Radcliffe College alumni
Smith College alumni
Smith College faculty
Fellows of the American Physical Society
20th-century American women scientists
American women physicists
Massachusetts Institute of Technology people
People from Carlisle, Pennsylvania
American women academics